Stonařov) is a market town in Jihlava District in the Vysočina Region of the Czech Republic. It has about 1,100 inhabitants.

Administrative parts
The hamlet of Sokolíčko is an administrative part of Stonařov.

Geography
It lies in the Křižanov Highlands. The Jihlávka River flows through the market town.

History
The first written mention of Stonařov is from 1347. The settlement was established in the early 13th century. In 1367 it received market town privileges.

Peasant rebellions in 1712–1722 were suppressed. The main trade and post road between Prague and Vienna built in 1750 went through Stonařov. On 22 May 1808 the place was hit by the Stannern meteorite.

Agriculture and small-scale textile production were the main sources of income, though at the end of the 19th century two textile manufacturies were built here. The municipality was damaged by large fires in 1900 and 1901. Before World War I the place was a target of tourists from Vienna. German-speaking inhabitants were expelled after the end of World War II.

Notable people
Arthur Seyss-Inquart (1892–1946), Austrian Nazi politician

Other
The asteroid 61208 Stonařov was named in its honour on 1 June 2007.

References

External links

Populated places in Jihlava District
Market towns in the Czech Republic